The following table is an overview of all national records in the 5000 metres.

Outdoor

Men

Women

References

 
5000 metres